Wolues Football Club is a British Virgin Islands football club based in Road Town. The club plays in the BVIFA National Football League. The team principally, but not exclusively, consists of British and Irish expats living in the British Virgin Islands. The name is reportedly attributable to a historic typographical error when the club was founded.

The club were the winners of the 2019 Terry Evans Cup.

Current squad

References 

Islanders